Alex Thomas Kessman (born January 2, 1998) is an American football placekicker for the Memphis Showboats of the United States Football League (USFL).

Career
He played college football for the Pittsburgh Panthers. He set the NCAA record for most accurate placekicker in history from 50+ yards going 12 of 18 from that distance.

Los Angeles Chargers
On May 2, 2021, Kessman signed as an undrafted free agent with the Los Angeles Chargers. However, Kessman was released by the Chargers prior to the start of the season on August 16, 2021.

New York Jets
On November 23, 2021, Kessman was signed to the practice squad of the New York Jets. On December 4, the Jets released incumbent kicker Matt Ammendola and signed Kessman to the active roster. In his one game with the Jets, which was also his NFL debut, Kessman missed both of his extra point attempts and the Jets lost to the Philadelphia Eagles by a score of 33-18. He was cut by the team the next day.

Carolina Panthers
On December 22, 2021, Kessman was signed to the Carolina Panthers practice squad. He was released on December 27.

Memphis Showboats
On January 28, 2023, Kessman signed with the Memphis Showboats of the United States Football League (USFL).

NFL career statistics

References

External links
Pittsburgh Panthers bio

1998 births
Living people
American football placekickers
Pittsburgh Panthers football players
Los Angeles Chargers players
New York Jets players
Carolina Panthers players
Memphis Showboats (2022) players